The 2011 Tour de Picardie was the 65th edition of the Tour de Picardie cycling stage race.  It started on 13 May in Abbeville and ended on 15 May in Peronne and consisted of three stages.

The race was won by Team Vacansoleil-DCM rider Romain Feillu, who claimed the leader's yellow and blue jersey after a strong finish on the 3rd stage. Feillu' winning margin over runner-up Kenny De Haes of Omega Pharma-Lotto was 8 seconds, and Katusha's Filippo Pozzato completed the podium, 8 seconds down on Feillu.

In the race's other classifications, Omega-Pharma Lotto rider Kenny de Haes won the points classification's green jersey. Bretagne-Schuller rider Johan Lethe King of the Mountains classification, with Saur-Sojasun finishing at the head of the teams classification.

Pre-race favourites
The winner of the 2010 Tour de Picardie, Ben Swift, was not looking to defend last year's victory because of his racing at the 2010 Tour of California, while other pre-race favourites like 3 stage winner of Tour Méditerranéen winner, Romain Feillu, as well as Kenny Dehaeswho was 5th at 2008.

Stages

1
13 May 2011 – Abbeville to La Neuville-en-Hez, 162 km
Stage Result and General Classification after Stage

2
14 May 2011 – Villers-Saint-Paul to Château-Thierry, 166.5 km
Stage Result and General Classification after Stage

3
15 May 2011 – Charly-sur-Marne to Péronne, 189.5 km
Stage Result and General Classification after Stage

Classification leadership

Winners

General classification

Points

Mountains

Team

References
 https://web.archive.org/web/20110605080558/http://www.letour.fr/2011/TDO/LIVE/fr/100/classement/index.html
 https://web.archive.org/web/20110623160520/http://www.letour.fr/2011/TDO/HISTO/fr/palmaresdepuis.html

See also
 https://web.archive.org/web/20110623140759/http://www.letour.fr/fr/homepage_courseTDO.html

Tour de Picardie
Tour de Picardie
2011